Bryce Gunnar Hager (born May 4, 1992) is an American football linebacker who is a free agent. He played college football at Baylor. He was drafted by the St. Louis Rams in the seventh round of the 2015 NFL Draft.

Early years
Hager attended and played high school football at Westlake High School, where his teammates included future NFL quarterback Nick Foles and kicker Justin Tucker.

College career
Hager attended and played college football for Baylor.

Collegiate statistics

Professional career

St. Louis / Los Angeles Rams
Hager was drafted by the St. Louis Rams in the seventh round, 224th overall, of the 2015 NFL Draft.

On May 6, 2019, Hager re-signed with the Rams. He was placed on injured reserve on November 12, 2019, with a shoulder injury.

Las Vegas Raiders
On August 7, 2020, Hager signed with the Las Vegas Raiders. He was released on August 23, 2020.

New York Jets
On September 22, 2020, Hager was signed to the New York Jets practice squad. He was elevated to the active roster on October 24 and October 31 for the team's weeks 7 and 8 games against the Buffalo Bills and Kansas City Chiefs, and reverted to the practice squad after each game. He was promoted to the active roster on November 3, 2020.

Personal life
Hager has a younger brother named Breckyn who previously played linebacker for the Texas Longhorns. Hager's father, Britt Hager, played nine years in the NFL with the Philadelphia Eagles, Denver Broncos, and St. Louis Rams.

References

External links
 Baylor Bears bio
 Los Angeles Rams bio

1992 births
Living people
American football linebackers
Baylor Bears football players
Las Vegas Raiders players
Los Angeles Rams players
New York Jets players
Players of American football from Austin, Texas
St. Louis Rams players